Luka Ivanović (born 18 May 1992), professionally known as Luke Black, is a Serbian singer-songwriter. Born in Čačak, he became the first Serbian artist to be signed under Universal Music Group, through which he released his debut EP Thornes in February 2015. It was followed by Neoslavic (2018) and F23.8 (2023). Luke Black is set to represent Serbia in the Eurovision Song Contest 2023 with the song "Samo mi se spava".

Early life and education 
Luka Ivanović was born on 18 May 1992 in Čačak, FR Yugoslavia. He pursued interest in music at the age of 12 when he started writing his own lyrics, and  a couple of years later also began creating and producing music. After graduating from the Grammar School of Čačak, Ivanović relocated to Belgrade to study English language and literature. He later moved to London, where he eventually graduated with a master's degree in music production.

Ivanović stated that his stage name "Luke" comes from the anglicisation of his first name, while "Black" originates from when he as a teenager expressed forty days of mourning for the "death of the Serbian music scene".

Career

2010−2019: Career beginnings, Thorns and Neoslavic
His career began when the performance of his song "D-Generation" was noticed by the representatives of Universal Music Group, offering him a recording contract. He made his recording debut with the help from the Serbian music collective Zemlja Gruva. In 2014, Black released his first single "Nebula Lullaby" through Spinnup. In May the same year, he had his first live performance at Belgrade Youth Center as a part of the Gruvlend Festival, which was organized by Zemlja Gruva to showcase new talents. "D-Generation" was officially released in February 2015 as the lead single to Luke's debut EP. The music video for the single was uploaded through the online video platform Vevo. "D-Generation" was followed by the second single "Holding On To Love" in May 2015. Thorns the EP was eventually released on 18 September 2015 under Universal. The following month, it was promoted at the Waves Vienna festival and Tvornica kulture in Zagreb, where Black served as the opening act for Lust For Youth. 

In May 2016, Black released the standalone single "Demons", produced by Venza from Spain. The song was also nominated to represent Serbia in the Eurovision Song Contest 2016 in Stockholm, but Radio Television of Serbia ultimately went with "Goodbye (Shelter)" by Sanja Vučić. In June, to promote the single Black embarked on a solo tour in China, performing in Beijing, Shanghai and Guangzhou. 

In April 2017, he performed at a fashion show during the Berlin Alternative Fashion Week, held at the Berghain nightclub. There he announced the release of his single "Walpurgis Night", produced by Swede Oscar Fogelström. Remastered versions of "Demons" and "Walpurgis Night" were included to Black's second EP Neoslavic, released in July 2018.

2020–present: F23.8 and Eurovision Song Contest
In April 2021, Black independently released "A House on the Hill", which was included on his EP F23.8.

In January 2023, he was announced as one of the contestants of Pesma za Evroviziju '23, the Serbian national selection for the Eurovision Song Contest 2023 with the song "Samo mi se spava". On 1 March, Black performed during the first semi-final, where he placed sixth and thus qualified for the final. Subsequently on 4 March, "Samo mi se spava" received the most points out of sixteen finalists by coming second on both the televote and the jury vote, making Luke Black the winner of the competition and Serbian representative for the contest in Liverpool.

Personal life 
Ivanović lives in London, England where he works as a graphic designer for a record label.

Discography

Extended plays 
 Thorns (2015)
 Neoslavic (2018)
 F23.8 (2023)

Singles

Music videos

References

External links 
 
 
 

1992 births
Living people
Musicians from Čačak
Serbian pop singers
Serbian electronic singers
21st-century Serbian male singers
Pesma za Evroviziju contestants
Pesma za Evroviziju winners
Eurovision Song Contest entrants of 2023